VIP Music Records is an American worldwide music corporation founded by Fabrizio Moreira that operates as a private company out of Brooklyn, New York. It claims to be the largest young music corporation for the Latin Market. VIP Music Records global corporate headquarters are in New York City, New York, United States.

In August 2018, Brooklyn-based record label VIP Music Records launched a platform called Secret Hit Music. The platform gathers a team that combines the intuition of new talent and producers with songwriters.

Current artists

Former artists

Discography

References

External links

h

Record label distributors
Mass media companies based in New York City
American record labels
Record labels established in 2009
2009 establishments in New York City